Paul Telfer is the name of:

 Paul Telfer (footballer) (born 1971), Scottish footballer
 Paul Telfer (actor) (born 1979), Scottish actor